Stephen Lushington may refer to:

 Sir Stephen Lushington, 1st Baronet (1744–1807), MP, Chairman of the British East India Company
 Stephen Lushington (judge) (1782–1873), MP, leading advocate of the abolition of slavery and Judge of the Admiralty Court
 Stephen Lushington (Royal Navy officer) (1803–1877), commander of the British naval brigade at Sebastopol in 1854
 Stephen Rumbold Lushington (1776–1868), MP, Governor of Madras 1827–1835